Ruth Sacks (born 1977) is a South African artist who lives and works in Johannesburg. She is currently a postdoctoral researcher in the South African Research Chair Initiative (SARChI) for Social Change at Fort Hare University. Sacks holds a PhD (Arts) from the University of the Witwatersrand where she was a fellow at the Wits Institute for Social and Economic Research (WiSER). Her third artist book, Twenty Thousand Leagues Under Seas, was launched in 2013. She is a laureate of the HISK in Ghent. She was one of the facilitators of the artist-run project space the Parking Gallery, hosted by the Visual Arts Network of South Africa (VANSA) in Johannesburg. Ruth Sacks' work has been presented internationally in venues such as the African Pavilion at the 52nd Venice Biennalein 2007, the ZKM Centre for Art and Media, Karlsruhe in 2011 and the National Museums of Kenya, Nairobi in 2017.

Education 

She obtained an MFA from the University of Cape Town in 2007. Sacks is a laureate of the Higher Institute for Fine Art (HISK) in Ghent, Belgium.

She obtained BFA, Michaelis School of Fine Art, University of Cape Town in 1999, MFA, Michaelis School of Fine Art, University of Cape Town in 2007 and PhD (Arts), University of the Witwatersrand, Johannesburg in 2017.

Work 

Sacks' work examines historical moments in art, architecture and the applied arts in order to comment on contemporary environments. She works with fictional narratives as a tool for encouraging multiple interpretations of dominant viewpoints. Sacks creates new fictions by revising and adapting existing texts and motifs, alongside developing new ones. Throughout her practice, emphasis is placed on the use of typography, design and language systems.
She mainly works with installation, text pieces and performance."Sacks' practice is research-based and usually takes the form of book works, installations and text pieces." – Gabi Ngcobo

Exhibitions 

Sacks has exhibited widely, with group exhibitions including: The Global Contemporary: Art Worlds after 1989 at ZKM |Centre for Art and Media (Germany, 2011), Performa 09, facilitated by the Museum for African Art New York (USA, 2009), Luanda_Pop Checklist at the 52nd Venice Biennale (Italy, 2007) and the 1st Architecture, Art and Landscape Biennial of the Canaries (Spain, 2006). Sacks' solo exhibitions include Matterings at TPO (Johannesburg, 2017), Open Endings at TTTT (Ghent, 2015), 2,000 Meters Above the Sea at CHR (Johannesburg, 2012), Double-Sided Accumulated at Extraspazio (Rome, 2010), False Friends at Kunstverein (Amsterdam, 2010) and Open Studio at Cortex Athletico (Bourdeaux, 2007). International group exhibitions include: Future Africa: Visions in Time at the National Museums of Kenya (Nairobi, 2017) and Iwalewa-Haus (Bayreuth, 2015), The Global Contemporary: Art Worlds after 1989 at ZKM |Centre for Art and Media (Karlsruhe, 2011), Performa 09, facilitated by the Museum for African Art (New York, 2009), the African Pavilion at the 52nd Venice Biennale (Venice, 2007) and the 1st Architecture, Art and Landscape Biennale of the Canaries (Tenerife, 2006).

Her third artist book, Twenty Thousand Leagues Under Seas, was scheduled to be launched at the Musee Jules Verne in Amiens, France. Previous books to date are: False Friends, published by Kunstverein Press, Amsterdam (the Netherlands, 2010) and An Extended Alphabet, published by Expodium, Utrecht (the Netherlands, 2011).

Published books 
Twenty Thousand Leagues Under Seas, 2013, Garamond Press
An Extended Alphabet, 2011, Expodium 
False Friends, 2010, Kunstverein Publishing

Awards 
2013–16:    Wits Institute for Social & Economic Research (WiSER) Doctoral Fellowship
2015:           Ivan Karp Doctoral Research Award
2013:           IFAS (French Institute of South Africa) publishing grant
2006:          1st prize, Absa LʼAtelier 2006

Recent publications 
"Lived Remainders: The Contemporary Lives of Iron Hotels in the Congo," In (2017), Doucet, I., Frichot, H. and C. Smith (eds), Architectural Theory Review No. 22, Special Edition: Resist, Reclaim, Speculate: Situated Perspectives on Architecture and the City, Taylor and Francis.
"Anonymous Objects as Exhibition Organisms," In (2016), Bowker, S. and Bremner, C. (eds.), Fusion Journal, special edition: Anonymous. The Void in Visual Culture, Charles Stuart University, Australia.
"Looking for the Congo in Congo Style,*" In (2015), Proceedings of the conference: Admired as well as Overlooked Beauty: Architecture and Urbanism of Historicism, Art Nouveau, Early Modern and Traditionalism, Češka, Brno, Czech Republic, pp. 231 – 243.

References 

1977 births
Living people
21st-century South African women artists
People from Johannesburg
University of the Witwatersrand alumni